Elena Fiore (26 July 1928 – 26 September 1999) was an Italian film actress, best known for her roles in Lina Wertmüller films.

Life and career 
Born in Naples, Fiore debuted in 1972 in the role Amalia Finocchiaro, an overweight, middle-aged woman full of sexual desires, in Wertmuller's The Seduction of Mimi. After similar roles in, among others, Love and Anarchy, Seven Beauties, Neapolitan Mystery and The Marquis of Grillo she retired from acting in the early 1980s.

References

External links 
 

1928 births
1999 deaths
Italian film actresses
Film people from Naples
20th-century Italian actresses